The Grice–Fearing House is the oldest house (ca. 1798) in Elizabeth City, North Carolina, located at 200 South Road Street. It is a contributing property in the Shepard Street–South Road Street Historic District, which is listed on the National Register of Historic Places.

The house was originally built for Francis Grice. After his death, his widow Mary married Isaiah Fearing, thus providing the house with its name.

The house is now operated as a two-suite bed and breakfast.

See also
Milford (Camden, North Carolina), another historic house of the Grice family, built in 1746, also known as "Relfe-Grice-Sawyer House"

References

External links
 The Grice–Fearing House web site
www.bbonline.com
 National Register Listings in North Carolina
  (page 7)

Houses on the National Register of Historic Places in North Carolina
Houses in Pasquotank County, North Carolina
Bed and breakfasts in North Carolina
Houses completed in 1798
Historic district contributing properties in North Carolina
National Register of Historic Places in Pasquotank County, North Carolina